Epepeotes lateralis is a species of beetle in the family Cerambycidae. It was described by Félix Édouard Guérin-Méneville in 1831, originally under the genus Monohammus. It is known from Sulawesi, Malaysia, Java, and Sumatra.

Subspecies
 Epepeotes lateralis lateralis (Guérin-Méneville, 1831)
 Epepeotes lateralis niasicus Aurivillius, 1932

References

lateralis
Beetles described in 1831